Copper Sky is a 1957 American Western film directed by Charles Marquis Warren and written by Eric Norden. The film stars Jeff Morrow, Coleen Gray, Strother Martin, Paul Brinegar, John Pickard and Patrick O'Moore. The film was released in September 1957, by 20th Century Fox.

Plot

Cast 
Jeff Morrow as Haxon 'Hack' Williams
Coleen Gray as Nora Hayes
Strother Martin as Pokey
Paul Brinegar as Charlie Martin
John Pickard as Trooper Hadley
Patrick O'Moore as Colonel Thurston
Jack Lomas as Lawson
William Hamel as Trumble 
Dorothy Schuyler as Townswoman

Production
It was known as The Far West.

Parts of the film were shot in Johnson Canyon and Kanab Canyon in Utah.

References

External links 
 

1957 films
20th Century Fox films
American Western (genre) films
1957 Western (genre) films
Films directed by Charles Marquis Warren
Films shot in Utah
Films scored by Raoul Kraushaar
1950s English-language films
1950s American films